Pseudonympha paludis, the paludis brown, is a butterfly of the family Nymphalidae. It is found in South Africa, from the Eastern Cape to Lesotho, the eastern part of the Free State, the Drakensberg in KwaZulu-Natal and high altitude mountains in Mpumalanga.

The wingspan is 34–38 mm for males and 32–36 mm for females. Adults are on wing from December to January at high altitudes and from November to April in the hills of the Eastern Cape (with a peak in mid-summer). There is one generation per year.

The larvae probably feed on Poaceae grasses.

References

Butterflies described in 1938
Pseudonympha